The Dancing Girl of Izu is a 1933 Japanese silent romance film directed by Heinosuke Gosho. It is the first adaptation of the 1926 short story  by Yasunari Kawabata.

Plot
During his vacation tour on Izu peninsula, Tokyo student Mizuhara befriends a group of local travelling musicians led by Eikichi. Eikichi lost the family's inheritance, a gold mine, due to his carelessness, which he had to sell for a low price to its new owner Zenbei. While staying in their hometown where they have an engagement, Eikichi's sister Kaoru falls in love with Mizuhara. Instigated by the mine's former engineer Kubota, Eikichi demands what he considers his fair share from Zenbei, but Zenbei replies that he will only give Eikichi money if he sells his sister Kaoru to him. Mizuhara confronts Zenbei, who also happens to be the father of his fellow student Ryūichi, with what he considers an insolent proposal. As it turns out, Zenbei, who was a friend of Eikichi's and Kaoru's father, wants to spare Kaoru the fate of living the life of a travelling musician. Unbeknownst to Kaoru and her brother, Zenbei secretly opened a bank account in her name and hopes to marry her to his son Ryūichi one day. Mizuhara and Kaoru part in tears upon his return to Tokyo, and before entering the boat which will take him home, he advises her to seek happiness in a stable life as Ryūichi's wife.

Cast
Den Ohinata (credited Den Obinata) as Mizuhara
Kinuyo Tanaka as Kaoru
Tokuji Kobayashi as Eikichi
Eiko Takamatsu as Otatsu, Eikichi's mother
Kinuko Wakamizu as Chiyoko, Eikichi's wife
Shizue Hyōdō as Yuriko
Jun Arai as Zenbei
Ryōichi Takeuchi as Ryūichi
Reikichi Kawamura as Kubota
Ryōtarō Mizushima as Tamura
Takeshi Sakamoto as Hattori
Chōko Iida as a geisha
Kikuko Hanaoka as a geisha
Shōzaburō Abe as customer
Kiyoshi Aono as Kisaku

Legacy
The Dancing Girl of Izu is not only the first, but also regarded the best of the many adaptations of Kawabata's story, and an important example of films connected to the junbungaku ("pure literature") movement, which favoured "serious" literature in opposition to "popular" literature. Gosho and his screenwriter Fushimi added a subplot and obscured the class differences between the characters, instead aiming at a nostalgic depiction of the country "untainted by modernization" (Mitsuyo Wada-Marciano).

Notes

References

External links

1933 films
1930s Japanese-language films
Japanese silent films
Japanese romance films
Japanese black-and-white films
Films based on short fiction
Films directed by Heinosuke Gosho